Carlos Enrique Santiago is a Puerto Rican American labor economist and the Commissioner of the Massachusetts Department of Higher Education (MDHE). Previously he was the chancellor of the University of Wisconsin–Milwaukee and the chief executive officer of the Hispanic College Fund.

Santiago is the author or co-author of six books and has published articles and book reviews, many of which focus on economic development and the changing socioeconomic status of Latinos in the United States. In 1996 and 2011, Santiago was named one of the 100 most influential Hispanics in the United States by Hispanic Business magazine.

Background 
Santiago received a B.A. from the University of Miami, an M.A. from the University of Puerto Rico, and an M.A. and Ph.D. from Cornell University, all in economics. He was a Ford Foundation Postdoctoral Fellow at the Department of Economics and Economic Growth Center at Yale University.

He is a labor economist with expertise in the Caribbean and Central America regions, with a special emphasis on Puerto Rico. He was Chair of the Department of Latin American & Caribbean Studies at the University at Albany. He is a founding co-editor of Latino Research Review and is a member of the U.S. Congressional Hispanic Caucus International Relations Advisory Group.

Academic administration 
Santiago taught at Wayne State University. He served as Provost and Vice President for Academic Affairs of the University at Albany, State University of New York.

From 2004 to 2010, he was the chancellor of the University of Wisconsin–Milwaukee and held a professorship within its Department of Economics. During his tenure at UW-Milwaukee, he raised 125 million dollars from the private sector for the school's research arm and advocated a 240 million dollar state-funded "UW-Milwaukee Initiative" campaign, before resigning to take the post at the Hispanic College Fund.

Santiago joined the MDHE in April 2013 as the Senior Deputy Commissioner for Academic Affairs, and was appointed Commissioner by Governor Charlie Baker in July 2015.

Bibliography

References

External links 
Official biography

Living people
Cornell University alumni
People from Milwaukee
Presidents of University at Albany
University at Albany, SUNY faculty
University of Miami alumni
University of Puerto Rico alumni
Chancellors of the University of Wisconsin-Milwaukee
Wayne State University faculty
Year of birth missing (living people)
American nonprofit chief executives
Economists from Wisconsin